Leonard White (born February 21, 1971) is an American former professional basketball player.  He is listed at 6'7" and weighed 224 lbs.  Born in Century, Florida, White started playing collegiate ball with the Faulkner State Community College (1989–1991) and is still the all-time leading scorer of the Sun Chiefs with a 22.7 ppg average.  He later transferred to Southern University (1991–1993) and led the Jaguars in scoring his last two years there.  White entered the 1993 NBA draft and was picked 53rd in the second round by the Los Angeles Clippers; however, he was not signed and never got to play in the NBA.  He played a few games in the French professional league in Pau Orthez but it is in the CBA where White will be making his mark in his professional basketball career as one of the league leaders in statistics for games played, minutes played, scoring, rebounds and steals.  White has played for the San Diego Wildcards, Grand Rapids Hoops, Rockford Lightning, Sioux Falls Skyforce and Yakama Sun Kings, where he helped them win back-to-back CBA championships.  He has also taken his game to the USBL with the Pennsylvania ValleyDawgs, the IBL with the Tacoma Jazz and overseas notably in Venezuela.  In the off-season, White coaches high school basketball in Florida.

Notable Awards
 2 x CBA All-Star (2005 & 2006)
 2 CBA Championships (2006 & 2007)
 All-CBA First Team (2004)
 CBA All-Defensive Team (2004)

References

External links
 Faulkner State Community College

1971 births
Living people
American expatriate basketball people in Mexico
American expatriate basketball people in Venezuela
American men's basketball players
Basketball players from Florida
Faulkner State Sun Chiefs men's basketball players
Forwards (basketball)
Grand Rapids Hoops players
Los Angeles Clippers draft picks
Mexico Aztecas players
Rockford Lightning players
San Diego Wildcards players
Sioux Falls Skyforce (CBA) players
Southern Jaguars basketball players
Yakama Sun Kings players
American expatriate basketball people in the Philippines
Magnolia Hotshots players
Philippine Basketball Association imports